Omobranchus anolius, the oyster blenny, is a species of combtooth blenny found in coral reefs in the western Pacific ocean. It can reach a maximum length of  TL.

References

anolius
Taxa named by Achille Valenciennes
Fish described in 1836